Sheikh Ahmad Beheshti , (born 1935) is an Iranian Ayatollah. He was the president of Qom University. He represented the people of Fars Province in the first and second terms in the Islamic Consultative Assembly, as well as the third, fourth, and fifth terms of the Assembly of Experts.

Early life and education 
Ahmad Beheshti was born on 1935 in Miyan Deh, Fasa, Fars province. He was born into a religious family, his father, Hajj Sheikh Abdul Majid Beheshti, was a Shia cleric and prayer leader in his hometown. He was described by people in his hometown as being a pious and humble man, who was very well connected to the people in that area. He also dug his own grave in his hometown, he slept in it for 2 days to remind himself of death.

Ahmad first began his Islamic studies with his father, and then with the advice of his father he attended the Agha Baba Khan Seminary in Shiraz in 1949. While there, he was taught by Hossein Ayatollahi and others. He stayed there until 1954, before attending the Khan School in Shiraz, where he was taught by Seyed Noureddin Hosseini Shirazi, and several other big scholars in the region. Finally, the last school in Shiraz he attended was the Hashemieh School in 1956. In 1959, he finally migrated to Qom to further his Islamic studies in Qom Seminary. While in Qom, he took major emphasis in Islamic philosophy, as well as the main subjects such as Islamic jurisprudence and others to attain Ijtihad. He was taught by many esteemed scholars such as Mohaghegh Damad, Ruhollah Khomeini, and Hossein Borujerdi. After becoming an Ayatollah, Ahmad then attended the Kharazmi University in Tehran to study Philosophy. In 1966, he obtained a PhD in Philosophy, Morteza Motahhari was one of his professors in the university. He then returned to Qom, to teach Islam in the seminaries as well as being a professor in universities in Tehran and Qom.

Teachers 
Throughout his life, Ahmad Beheshti had many teachers, here are some of them.

Political activities and responsibilities 
Before the 1979 Iranian revolution, Ahmad Beheshti was against the Pahlavi dynasty. He received several travel bans for his sentiment against the Shah, as well as being arrested.

After the revolution, Ahmad was elected by the people of Fars province to represent them in the Iranian Parliament for two terms. He was the president of University of Qom from 2010 to 2013 after the death of Ayatollah Khorramabadi. Asghar Dirbaz was then chosen to take over him after he resigned from the position. He represents the people of Fars for the Assembly of Experts for Leadership since 1998. Since 2014, he has also been the Imam of Friday Prayer in Miyan Deh, Fasa.

Works 
Behehsti has published and translated many works. Here is the list of his works.

Books published

Books translated 

 The Answer to the Doubts About the Shiite School (1992)
 Existence and its Causes (2004)
 Steps to Advertising (2005)
 Abstraction (Explanation of the Seventh Pattern from Ibn Sina's book of Signs and Warnings) (2006)

Articles published

See also 
 List of Ayatollahs
 List of members in the Third Term of the Council of Experts
 List of members in the Fourth Term of the Council of Experts
 List of members in the Fifth Term of the Council of Experts

References 

1935 births
Living people
Iranian ayatollahs
Members of the Assembly of Experts
People from Fars Province
Islamic Consultative Assembly
20th-century Iranian philosophers